Sharon Lee Buchanan, OAM (née Patmore; (born 12 March 1963) is an Australian retired field hockey forward, who competed in three Summer Olympics for her country, starting in 1984.

Born in Busselton, Western Australia, Buchanan was inducted into the Sport Australia Hall of Fame in 1994.

 Buchanan is married to Cairns resident Philip Reid.

References

External links
 
sports-reference

1963 births
Living people
Australian female field hockey players
Olympic field hockey players of Australia
Field hockey players at the 1984 Summer Olympics
Field hockey players at the 1988 Summer Olympics
Field hockey players at the 1992 Summer Olympics
Field hockey people from Western Australia
Recipients of the Medal of the Order of Australia
Sport Australia Hall of Fame inductees
Olympic gold medalists for Australia
People from Busselton
People educated at Churchlands Senior High School
Medalists at the 1988 Summer Olympics
Olympic medalists in field hockey
20th-century Australian women